Atargatis is a German heavy metal band, formed in Regensburg in 1997.

Name
Atargatis is the name of the Syrian goddess of fertility and motherhood.

Members

Current Line-Up 
Stephanie Luzie – Vocals
Artur Vladinovskij - Guitar
Lord Lornhold – Bass, backing vocals
Tialupa - Violin
Shadrak – Drums

Former members 
Maximilian Schulz - Guitar (2008–2009)
Ernst Wurdack (Azmo) – Guitar (2005–2008)
Florian Ramsauer (Sagoth) - Guitar
Margit (Satyria) - Keyboards
Martin Buchmann - Guitar

Discography

Studio albums
Wasteland (2006)
Nova (2007)

EPs
Alba Gebraich (EP, 1999)
Divine Awakening (EP, 2004)

Demo 
Accurst from the Deep (EP, 2002)

References

External links

Atargatis at MusicMight
Atargatis at Last.fm
Atargatis at Encyclopaedia Metallum
Atargatis at www.naglfar.ru (Russian)

German gothic metal musical groups
Musical groups established in 1999
Musical quintets
Massacre Records artists
1999 establishments in Germany